Emancipation Day is observed in many former European colonies in the Caribbean and areas of the United States on various dates to commemorate the emancipation of slaves of African descent.

On August 1, 1985, Trinidad and Tobago became the first independent country to declare a national holiday to commemorate the abolition of slavery.

It is also observed in other areas in regard to the abolition. Or other forms of involuntary servitude.

Trinidad and Tobago
On August 1, 1985 Trinidad and Tobago became the first independent country in the world to declare a national holiday to commemorate the abolition of slavery.

In Trinidad and Tobago, Emancipation Day replaced Columbus Discovery Day, which commemorated the arrival of Christopher Columbus at Moruga on 31 July 1498, as a national public holiday.

The commemoration begins the night before with an all-night vigil and includes religious services, cultural events, street processions past historic landmarks, addresses from dignitaries including an address from the Prime minister of Trinidad and Tobago and ends with an evening of shows that include a torchlight procession to the national stadium.

August 1

The Slavery Abolition Act 1833, which abolished slavery throughout the British Empire (with the exceptions "of the Territories in the Possession of the East India Company", the "Island of Ceylon" and "the Island of Saint Helena"; the exceptions were eliminated in 1843), came into force the following year, on 1 August 1834.

Only slaves below the age of six were freed. Enslaved people older than six years of age were redesignated as "apprentices" and required to work, 40 hours per week without pay, as part of compensation payment to their former owners. Full emancipation was finally achieved at midnight on 31 July 1838.

Antigua and Barbuda
Antigua and Barbuda celebrates carnival on and around the first Monday of August. Since 1834 Antigua and Barbuda have observed the end of slavery. The first Monday and Tuesday in August was observed as a bank holiday so the populace can celebrate Emancipation Day. Monday is J'ouvert, a street party that mimics the early morning emancipation.

Anguilla
Anguilla: In addition to commemorating emancipation, it is the first day of "August Week", the Anguillian Carnival celebrations. J'ouvert is celebrated August 1, as Carnival commences.

The Bahamas
The Bahamas: Celebrations are mainly concentrated in Fox Hill Village, Nassau, a former slave village whose inhabitants, according to folklore, heard about their freedom a week after everyone else on the island. The celebration known as the Bay Fest, beginning on August 1 and lasting several days, is held in the settlement of Hatchet Bay on the island of Eleuthera, and "Back to the Bay" is held in the settlement of Tarpum Bay, also on Eleuthera.

Barbados
Emancipation Day in Barbados is part of the annual "Season of Emancipation", which began in 2005. The Season runs from April 14 to August 23. Commemorations include:
 the anniversary of Bussa's rebellion, a major slave rebellion in 1816, April 14
 National Heroes Day, April 28;
 Crop Over festival, which includes May, June and the first week of August
 Africa Day, May 25
 Day of National Significance, which commemorates the Labour Rebellion of 1937, July 26
 Emancipation Day, August 1
 birthday of Marcus Garvey, August 17
 International Day for the Remembrance of the Slave Trade and its Abolition, August 23

Emancipation Day celebrations usually feature a walk from Independence Square in Bridgetown to the Heritage Village at the Crop Over Bridgetown Market on the Spring Garden Highway. At the Heritage Village, in addition to a concert, there is a wreath-laying ceremony as a tribute to the ancestors. Traditionally, the Prime Minister, the Minister for Culture, and representatives of the Commission for Pan African Affairs are among those laying wreaths.

Belize

Starting 2021, Belize joins other Caribbean nations in the observance of Emancipation Day on 1 August to commemorate the emancipation of enslaved people in the Caribbean in 1834.

Bermuda
Bermuda celebrates its Emancipation Day on the Thursday before the first Monday in August, placing it in either July or August.

British Virgin Islands
British Virgin Islands: The first Monday, Tuesday, and Wednesday of August are celebrated as "August Festival".

Canada
In March 2021, the Canadian House of Commons voted unanimously on a motion to recognize 1 August as Emancipation Day across Canada. However, African-Canadian communities have commemorated Emancipation Day since the 1800s, most notably Black communities in the towns of Windsor, Owen Sound, Amherstburg, and Sandwich, in Ontario, and provinces including New Brunswick and Nova Scotia.

The first of August marks the day the Slavery Abolition Act 1833 ended slavery in the British Empire in 1834 and, thus, also in Canada. However, the first colony in the British Empire to have anti-slavery legislation was Upper Canada, now Ontario. John Graves Simcoe, the first Lieutenant Governor of Upper Canada, passed the 1793 Act Against Slavery, banning the importation of slaves and mandating that children born to enslaved women would be enslaved until they were 25 years old, as opposed to in perpetuity. This was the first jurisdiction in the British Empire to abolish the slave trade and limit slavery. The Act Against Slavery was superseded by the Slavery Abolition Act.

Nova Scotia
Emancipation Day was set on 1 August by the Legislative Assembly of Nova Scotia on 13 April 2021. The event is marked with a provincial ceremony, as well as community-led events. Lieutenant Governor of Nova Scotia Arthur LeBlanc said in 2022, "as a province, we come together to renew our commitment to equity, peace, and dignity for all. We continue to structure our institutions and communities around the value of inclusion so that past harms are not repeated." The province also recognizes 23 August as the International Day for the Remembrance of the Slave Trade and its Abolition, in recognition of people of African descent in Haiti and the Dominican Republic fighting for their freedom in 1791.

Ontario

In 2008, the provincial legislature designated August 1 as Emancipation Day. The act of parliament stated in its preamble: "it is important to recognize the heritage of Ontario’s Black community and the contributions that it has made and continues to make to Ontario. It is also important to recall the ongoing international struggle for human rights and freedom from repression for persons of all races, which can be best personified by Lieutenant Governor John Graves Simcoe and Dr Martin Luther King Jr. Accordingly, it is appropriate to recognize August 1 formally as Emancipation Day and to celebrate it."

Notable Emancipation Day commemoriation include The Big Picnic, organised by the Toronto Division of the Universal Negro Improvement Association (UNIA), which attracted thousands of attendees from the 1920s through to the 1950s. The first The Big Picnic was held in 1924, at Lakeside Park, in the community of Port Dalhousie.

In 1932, the first Emancipation Day Parade was held in Windsor and would come to be known as the "greatest freedom show on Earth." Organized by Walter Perry, the parade and festival boasted famous guests like Martin Luther King Jr, Mary McLeod Bethune, Stevie Wonder, Benjamin Mays, Fred Shuttlesworth, Martha Reeves and The Vandellas, and Eleanor Roosevelt. Though Perry's death in 1968 had a significant influence on the end of the tradition, fears over the Detroit Riot of 1967 caused the city's councillors to deny organizers necessary permits to stage an Emancipation Day celebration. Owen Sound has celebrated Emancipation with a picnic for 157 years, and now holds an Emancipation Festival.

Toronto hosts the Toronto Caribbean Carnival (known as Caribana until 2006), which is held the first Saturday in August of Civic Holiday, observed on the first Monday of August. Started in 1967, it is a two-week celebration culminating in the long weekend, with the Kings and Queens Festival, Caribana parade, and Olympic Island activities.

Dominica
Dominica: The first Monday is celebrated as August Monday. It marks the end of slavery in 1834.

Grenada
Grenada: The first Monday in August is celebrated as Emancipation Day with Cultural activities.

Guyana
Guyana: The first of August is celebrated as Emancipation Day with Cultural activities, and events; including family gathering where they cook traditional food such as cook-up.

Jamaica

1 August, Emancipation Day in Jamaica is a public holiday and part of a week-long cultural celebration, during which Jamaicans also celebrate Jamaican Independence Day on August 6, 1962. Both August 1 and August 6 are public holidays.

Emancipation Day had stopped being observed as a nation holiday in 1962 at the time of independence. It was reinstated as a national public holiday under The Holidays (Public General) Act 1998 after a six-year campaign led by Rex Nettleford, among others.

Traditionally people would keep at vigil on July 31 and at midnight ring church bell and play drums in parks and public squares to re-enact the first moments of freedom for enslaved Africans. On Emancipation Day there is a reenactment of the reading of the Emancipation Declaration in town centres especially Spanish Town which was the seat of the Jamaican government when the Emancipation Act was passed in 1838.

Emancipation Park, a public park in Kingston, opened on the eve of Emancipation Day, July 31 in 2002, is named in commemoration of Emancipation Day.

Saint Kitts and Nevis
Saint Kitts and Nevis: The first Monday and Tuesday of August are celebrated as "Emancipation Day" and also "Culturama" in Nevis.

Saint Vincent and the Grenadines
Saint Vincent and the Grenadines also celebrates August Monday.

South Africa 

The Slavery Abolition Act of 1833 came into full effect in the Cape Colony on the December 1, 1838 after a four-year period of forced apprenticeship. About 39,000 enslaved people were freed and £1.2 million (roughly equivalent to £4,175,000,000 as a proportion of GDP in 2016 pounds) – of £3 million originally set aside by the British government – was paid out in compensation to 1,300 former slave holding farmers in the colony.

December 1 is celebrated as Emancipation Day in South Africa most notably in the city of Cape Town.

French West Indies
This includes eight territories currently under French sovereignty in the Antilles islands of the Caribbean:

Martinique commemorates emancipation with a national holiday on May 22, marking the slave resistance on that day in 1848 that forced Governor Claude Rostoland to issue a decree abolishing slavery.

Guadeloupe commemorates emancipation on May 27.
Saint Martin has a week-long celebration around May 27, commemorating the abolition of slavery.

Central America 

On the Caribbean Coast of Nicaragua the emancipation of slavery took place in the month of August 1841 but with different dates.

Bluefields and Pearl Lagoon received their emancipation on August 10, 1841.

Corn Island received its emancipation on August 27, 1841.

Suriname - July 1

On 1 July, Keti Koti (Sranantongo: "the chain is cut" or "the chain is broken") is celebrated that marks Emancipation Day in Suriname, a former colony of the Kingdom of the Netherlands. The day also remembers that enslaved people in Suriname would not be fully free until 1873, after a mandatory 10-year transition period during which time they were required to work on the plantations for minimal pay and with state sanctioned force.

United States

District of Columbia - April 16
The District of Columbia observes April 16 as Emancipation Day. On that day in 1862, President Abraham Lincoln signed the District of Columbia Compensated Emancipation Act (an act of Compensated emancipation) for the release of certain persons held to service or labor in the District of Columbia. The Act, introduced by Massachusetts senator and ardent abolitionist Henry Wilson, freed about 3,100 slaves in the District of Columbia nine months before President Lincoln issued his broader Emancipation Proclamation. The District of Columbia Compensated Emancipation Act represents the only example of compensation by the federal government to former owners of emancipated slaves.

On January 4, 2005, Mayor Anthony A. Williams signed legislation making Emancipation Day an official public holiday in the District. Although Emancipation Day occurs on April 16, by law when April 16 falls during a weekend, Emancipation Day is observed on the nearest weekday. This affects the Internal Revenue Service's due date for tax returns, which traditionally must be submitted by April 15. As the federal government observes the holiday, it causes the federal and all state tax deadlines to be moved to the 18th if Emancipation Day falls on a Saturday and to the 17th if Emancipation Day falls on a Monday. Each year, activities are now held during this observed holiday, including the traditional Emancipation Day parade. The parade had taken place yearly from 1866 to 1901. After a 101-year hiatus, DC's parade resumed in 2002, just three years ahead of the new holiday.

Florida - May 20

The state of Florida observes emancipation in a ceremonial day on May 20. In the capital, Tallahassee, Civil War re-enactors playing the part of Major General Edward McCook and other union soldiers act out the speech General McCook gave from the steps of the Knott House on May 20, 1865. This was the first reading of the Emancipation Proclamation in Florida.

Georgia - Saturday closest to May 29

Thomaston, Georgia has been the site of an Emancipation Day celebration since May 1866. Organizers believe it is "the oldest, continuously observed annual emancipation event in the United States."  The annual event is scheduled for the Saturday closest to May 29. William Guilford was an early organizer of the event first held in 1866.

Kentucky and Tennessee - August 8 

Emancipation Day is celebrated on August 8 in Hopkinsville, Christian County; Paducah, McCracken County; and Russellville, Logan County Kentucky, as well as other communities in western Kentucky and for many years in Southern Illinois in Hardin County. According to the Paducah Sun newspaper, this is the anniversary of the day slaves in this region learned of their freedom in 1865. According to a PBS documentary, it celebrates the liberation of the people enslaved by U.S. President Andrew Johnson, one of whom started the annual celebration in eastern Tennessee.

Maryland - November 1
Emancipation Day is celebrated in Maryland on November 1. Maryland started officially recognizing Emancipation Day in 2013, when then-Governor Martin O’Malley signed a measure to celebrate the freeing of slaves in Maryland on Nov. 1. Slavery was abolished in Maryland just six months before the end of the Civil War. Maryland's slavery abolishment also was approved two months before the U.S. Constitution's 13th Amendment was passed by Congress, and a full year before the 13th Amendment was ratified.

On November 1, 2020, Maryland Governor Larry Hogan issued a proclamation recognizing Maryland Emancipation Day. "156 years ago, a new state constitution abolished slavery in Maryland. I have issued a proclamation recognizing Maryland Emancipation Day as we reflect on the legacies of the brave Marylanders who risked everything so that they and others might enjoy the promise of freedom."

On October 30, 2020, Montgomery County Executive Marc Elrich and County Council President Sidney Katz, on behalf of the entire Council, presented a joint proclamation Friday proclaiming Sunday, Nov. 1, as “Emancipation Day” in Montgomery County.

Mississippi - May 8

In Columbus, Mississippi, Emancipation Day is celebrated on May 8, known locally as "Eight o' May". As in other southern states, the local celebration commemorates the date in 1865 when African Americans in eastern Mississippi learned of their freedom.

Though the 13th amendment was ratified by the necessary three quarters vote, Mississippi withheld its ratification document after the constitutional amendment was submitted to the states.  Mississippi finally submitted the ratification document on February 7, 2013.

Texas - June 19

In Texas, Emancipation Day is celebrated on June 19. It commemorates the announcement in Texas of the abolition of slavery made on that day in 1865. It is commonly known as Juneteenth. Since the late 20th century, this date has gained recognition beyond Texas, and became a federal holiday in 2021.

Virginia - April 3

In Richmond, Virginia, April 3 is commemorated as Emancipation Day. April 3 marks the day. in 1865. that Richmond fell to the Union Army, who were led by the United States Colored Troops.

Territories

Puerto Rico - March 22

Puerto Rico celebrates Emancipation Day, an official holiday, on March 22. Slavery was abolished in Puerto Rico in 1873 while the island was still a colony of Spain.

US Virgin Islands - July 3

The United States Virgin Islands celebrates V.I. Emancipation Day (Danish West Indies Emancipation Day) as an official holiday on July 3. It commemorates the Danish Governor Peter von Scholten's 1848 proclamation that "all unfree in the Danish West Indies are from today emancipated," following a slave rebellion led by John Gottlieb (Moses Gottlieb, General Buddhoe) in Frederiksted,
Saint Croix.

In addition to recognizing Emancipation Day, since 2017 the full week leading up to July 3 has been recognized as Virgin Islands Freedom Week. Emancipation Day, Freedom Week, and the culmination of St. John Festival are celebrated throughout the U.S. Virgin Islands with concerts, dancing, workshops, a historical skit, and a reenactment of the walk to Fort Frederik.

See also
 Abolitionism
 Fifth of July (New York)
 Juneteenth
 Kwanzaa
 Slave Trade Acts
 Thirteenth Amendment to the United States Constitution

References

Public holidays in Trinidad and Tobago
International observances
Types of secular holidays
March observances
April observances
May observances
June observances
July observances
August observances
Holidays and observances by scheduling (nth weekday of the month)
Emancipation day
History of slavery in the District of Columbia
Black Canadian culture
Public holidays in Canada